is a Japanese film director working in Japan and France. His directorial works and screenplays often make use of improvisation techniques. Currently, Suwa is the President of Tokyo Zokei University.

Biography
Having graduated from Hiroshima Prefectural Hatsukaichi High School (located in Hatsukaichi, Hiroshima), Suwa studied at Tokyo Zokei University, under the tutorship of Nobuhiro Kawanaka. While at the college, he began working producing independent films, of which Hanasareru Gang was chosen for the Pia Film Festival. After graduating from Tokyo Zokei, Suwa began directing television documentary films, and worked with directors such as Sōgo Ishii and Masashi Yamamoto.

In 1996, his feature film directorial debut,  was released. Suwa's second film, M/Other, was released soon after in 1999, winning the prestigious FIPRESCI Prize at the 1999 Cannes Film Festival and being the subject of several other awards and critical acclaim, both in Japan and internationally. M/Other also won the award for best screenplay at the 50th Mainichi Film Awards. His assistant director in the film was Miwa Nishikawa.

Suwa's third feature film, H Story (starring Kō Machida), was released in March 2000. It presents itself as an autobiographical documentary on an attempt to remake Alain Resnais' Hiroshima Mon Amour, and had been noted as an audacious attempt at a Nouvelle Vague portrayal of his hometown, Hiroshima. The film is bilingual French-Japanese. Also during the same year, he guest-appeared in and co-created the Sōgo Ishii-directed samurai epic Gojoe Reisenki: GOJEI.

In 2005, he directed and wrote , which featured a French cast and crew and is entirely in French. The film won the Special Prize of the Jury Award and the C.I.C.A.E. Award at the 58th Locarno Film Festival.

Later, in 2006, Suwa participated in the international omnibus film Paris, je t'aime. He directed and wrote the segment representing the 2nd arrondissement, filmed at Place des Victoires. Paris, je t'aime was the opening film of the Un Certain Regard selection at the 2006 Cannes Film Festival.

In 2009, Suwa directed jointly with Hippolyte Girardot Yuki & Nina, another French-Japanese bilingual movie which was shot in both France and Japan.

Directorial works
 Santa ga machi ni yatte kuru (16mm) (1982)
Hanasareru GANG (8mm) (1995)
2/Duo (1997)
M/Other (1999)
H Story ( 2001)
After war (Segment: "A letter from Hiroshima") (2002)
Un couple parfait (2005)
Paris je t'aime (segment: Place des Victoires) (2006)
Yuki & Nina (co-directed with Hippolyte Girardot) (2009)
The Lion Sleeps Tonight (2017)
Voices in the Wind (2020)

Television documentaries
Abe Kobo ga sagashiateta jidai (1994)
Hollywood wo Kaketa Kaiyū-itan no hito Kamiyama Sojin  (1995; Higashinippon Broadcasting)

Acting work
 Onoda: 10,000 Nights in the Jungle (2021)

References

External links

Profile at Tokyo Zokei University 
 Extensive interview of Suwa about his career before M/Other (in French)
 For a study of French language in Suwa's movies, see A. D'Hautcourt, « Nobuhiro Suwa et le(s) français », Journal of Inquiry and Research 92, 2010, p. 129-139 (in French)

Japanese film directors
Japanese screenwriters
People from Hiroshima
1960 births
Living people
Tokyo Zokei University alumni
Academic staff of Tokyo Zokei University
Academic staff of Tokyo University of the Arts
Presidents of universities and colleges in Japan